A total solar eclipse occurred on Thursday, April 16, 1874. A solar eclipse occurs when the Moon passes between Earth and the Sun, thereby totally or partly obscuring the image of the Sun for a viewer on Earth. A total solar eclipse occurs when the Moon's apparent diameter is larger than the Sun's, blocking all direct sunlight, turning day into darkness. Totality occurs in a narrow path across Earth's surface, with the partial solar eclipse visible over a surrounding region thousands of kilometres wide.

Observations

Related eclipses 
It is a part of solar Saros 117.

References

 NASA chart graphics
 Googlemap
 NASA Besselian elements
 

1874 04 16
1874 in science
1874 04 16
April 1874 events